Donacaula semifuscalis is a moth in the family Crambidae. It was described by George Hampson in 1919. It is found in the Brazilian states of Mato Grosso and Pernambuco and in Bolivia.

References

Moths described in 1919
Schoenobiinae